Leptodactylus riveroi is a species of frog in the family Leptodactylidae. It is also known as Rivero's white-lipped frog.

It is found in Brazil, Colombia, Venezuela, and possibly Peru. Its natural habitats are subtropical or tropical moist lowland forests and rivers. It is not considered threatened by the IUCN.  It was discovered by Juan A. Rivero.

References

 Current IUCN Red List of all Threatened Species

riveroi
Frogs of South America
Amphibians of Brazil
Amphibians of Colombia
Amphibians of Venezuela
Least concern biota of South America
Amphibians described in 1983
Taxa named by Juan A. Rivero
Taxonomy articles created by Polbot